Victor or Vic Johnson may refer to:
Victor S. Johnson Sr. (1882–1943), founder of The Mantle Lamp Company of America, later renamed Aladdin Industries
Victor S. Johnson Jr. (1916–2008), lawyer, heir to Aladdin Industries, and civic leader in Nashville, Tennessee
Victor Johnson (cyclist) (1883–1951), British track cyclist
Vic Johnson (baseball) (1920–2005), American Major League Baseball pitcher
Vic Johnson (musician), guitarist with Sammy Hagar's backing band The Waboritas
Victor Johnson (footballer), Australian rules footballer

See also
Victor Johnston (born 1943), psychologist